Willem "Wim" Schermerhorn (17 December 1894 – 10 March 1977) was a Dutch politician who served as Prime Minister of the Netherlands from 25 June 1945 until 3 July 1946. He was a member of the now-defunct Free-thinking Democratic League (VDB) and later co-founder of the Labour Party (PvdA). According to Harry W. Laidler, the government under Schermerhorn's premiership "achieved important results in the fields of labor, finance, housing, old age pensions, and the social services".

Early life
Willem Schermerhorn was born on 17 December 1894 in Akersloot in the Dutch Province of North Holland. He grew up in a Protestant family of farmers. He became professor of land surveying and geodesy at the Delft University of Technology on 7 September 1926. He was a leader in photogrammetry and founder of the International Training Centre for Aerial Survey. The International Society for Photogrammetry and Remote Sensing has offers an award in memory of Schermerhorn.

Schermerhorn remained professor until 1944, when he was removed by the German occupational forces because of his activities in the Dutch resistance. He was interned by the German occupational forces as a hostage in Sint-Michielsgestel from May 1942 until December 1943. After he was removed as professor in 1944 Schermerhorn went into hiding to avoid being taken prisoner by the German occupational forces.

Politics
On 24 June 1945 he became Prime Minister of the cabinet Schermerhorn/Drees, the first cabinet after World War II. Schermerhorn was the first Dutch Prime Minister who appointed civil servants with a political background, people like Koos Vorrink and Hendrik Brugmans (nicknamed "The Schermerboys"). After the elections of 1946 he became a member of parliament, as a member of the social-democratic Labour Party. He remained a member of parliament until 1951. After his parliamentarian career ended he became director of the International Training Center for Aerial Survey in 1951 (until 1969). In 1956 he became member of the Royal Netherlands Academy of Arts and Sciences.

Personal life
On 9 April 1919, Schermerhorn married Barbara Rook (13 June 1897 – 7 January 1986). Wim Schermerhorn died on 10 March 1977 in Haarlem. He was 82.

His brother, was an engineer in the Soviet Union (he was involved in the construction of the Moscow Subway). He was killed during the Stalinist purges in 1937. His sister, Neeltje, was married to theologian Johannes Marie de Jonge, principal of the Theological Seminary of the Dutch Reformed Church in Driebergen (1960–1968).

Decorations

References

External links

Official
  Dr.Ir. W. (Willem) Schermerhorn Parlement & Politiek
  Dr.Ir. W. Schermerhorn (PvdA) Eerste Kamer der Staten-Generaal
  Kabinet-Schermerhorn-Drees (1945-1946) Rijksoverheid

1894 births
1977 deaths
Prime Ministers of the Netherlands
Delft University of Technology alumni
Academic staff of the Delft University of Technology
Dutch cartographers
Dutch civil engineers
Dutch magazine editors
Dutch resistance members
Dutch technology writers
Dutch people of World War II
Dutch political party founders
Dutch prisoners of war in World War II
Free-thinking Democratic League politicians
Grand Officers of the Order of Orange-Nassau
Knights of the Order of the Netherlands Lion
Labour Party (Netherlands) politicians
Members of the House of Representatives (Netherlands)
Members of the Royal Netherlands Academy of Arts and Sciences
Members of the Senate (Netherlands)
People from Akersloot
Remonstrants
World War II prisoners of war held by Germany
World War II civilian prisoners
20th-century Dutch civil servants
20th-century Dutch educators
20th-century Dutch engineers
20th-century Dutch male writers
20th-century Dutch politicians
Photogrammetrists
20th-century cartographers